The Ndonde, or Ndonde Hamba, are an ethnic and linguistic group based in Nachingwea District, in the Lindi Region of southern Tanzania.  In 2002 the Ndonde population was estimated to number between 10,000 and 20,000 .

The main Ndonde language is Ndonde Hamba, also known as Mawanda - A Bantu language of Tanzania

Ethnic groups in Tanzania
Indigenous peoples of East Africa